Giovanni Matteo Konings, OSCr (died 1929) was a Prelate of the Roman Catholic Church.

Konings was a member of the Canons Regular of the Order of the Holy Cross. In 1926 he was appointed Prefect of the then Mission "Sui Iuris" of Bulawayo. He died in 1929.

See also
 Archdiocese of Bulawayo

External links
 Catholic-Hierarchy
  Bulawayo Diocese

Rhodesian Roman Catholic bishops
1929 deaths
Year of birth missing
Canons Regular of the Order of the Holy Cross
Roman Catholic bishops of Bulawayo